The 2021–22 Serie A de México season is part of the third-tier football league of Mexico. The tournament began on 17 September 2021 and finished on 15 May 2022.

Offseason Changes
 27 teams will participate in the season.
 Since 2021–22 season, the season will once again be divided into two tournaments: Apertura and Clausura.
 On June 18, 2021, but was confirmed by the team a week later, Cruz Azul Hidalgo has been put on hiatus due to financial and economic issues within the club.
After taking a hiatus due to COVID–19, Sporting Canamy, UAT and Yalmakán returns to participate in Serie A for 2021–22 season.
 On June 23, 2021, Aguacateros CDU returns to Serie B after an invite to participate in Serie A for the 2020–21 season when Serie B was suspended.
 On June 26, 2021, Fuertes de Fortín was promoted from Liga TDP, however, due to problems with its field, the team was sold to businessmen from Orizaba, who relocated it to their city and was renamed Montañeses F.C. 
 On June 26, 2021 Club RC–1128 was promoted from Liga TDP, however, due to problems with its field, the team was merged with Catedráticos Elite F.C. and took the identity of this club, so it was relocated in Ameca.
 On June 29, 2021, Atlético San Luis dissolved due to a financial restructuring of the club.
 On June 30, 2021, Mineros de Fresnillo has been put on hiatus due to sponsorship funding issues. However, later Mineros de Zacatecas became part of the owners of the club, so the continuity of the team for the 2021–22 season was assured. 
 On May 16, 2021, C.D. Irapuato sportively won the promotion to the Liga de Expansión MX. However, on June 3, 2021, the Mexican Football Federation announced the opening of a selection process to choose the club that would occupy the Liga Premier 3 place,  because Irapuato must still meet some requirements to compete in the Liga de Expansión MX, three Liga Premier clubs (Durango, Irapuato and Matamoros), were chosen for an audit process that would determine the winner of the promotion. On July 5, 2021, it was confirmed that no team undergoing the certification audit approved the procedure, so there will be no club promoted from the Liga Premier.
 On July 15, 2021, CAFESSA Jalisco has been placed on hiatus, will not participate this season.
 On July 15, 2021, Coras de Nayarit F.C. announced it return to the League after a one-year hiatus, however, the team was renamed Coras F.C.
 On July 29, 2021, Zitácuaro has been placed on one–year hiatus due to financial issues, will not participate this season.
 On July 30, 2021, Pioneros de Cancún has been placed on hiatus.
 On July 30, 2021, Escorpiones, Leviatán, Lobos ULMX, Tritones Vallarta and Zap joined the league as expansion teams.
 On July 30, 2021, Chalco and Cuautla returned to Serie B.
 On July 30, 2021 Inter de Querétaro F.C. obtained its own official register in the league, as during the second half of the previous season the team entered the category but officially played as Azores de Hidalgo F.C.
 Before the start of the season Cañoneros Marina was renamed Cañoneros F.C.
 On September 10, 2021, Irapuato was put on hiatus due to the lack of agreement between the owners of the club and the Irapuato city council, this after the expiration of the rights to use the Stadium by the team management.

Teams information

Group 1

Group 2
{{Location map+ |Mexico |width=700|float=right |caption=Location of teams in the 2021–22 Serie A Group 2 |places=

Torneo Apertura

Group 1

Standings

Positions by Round

Results

Group 2

Standings

Positions by Round

Results

Regular Season statistics

Top goalscorers
Players sorted first by goals scored, then by last name.

Source:Liga Premier FMF

Hat-tricks

(H) – Home ; (A) – Away

Attendance

Per team

Source: Liga Premier FMF

Highest and lowest

Source: Liga Premier FMF

Liguilla
The four best teams of each group play two games against each other on a home-and-away basis. The higher seeded teams play on their home field during the second leg. The winner of each match up is determined by aggregate score. In the quarterfinals and semifinals, if the two teams are tied on aggregate the higher seeded team advances. In the final, if the two teams are tied after both legs, the match goes to extra time and, if necessary, a penalty shoot-out.

Quarter-finals
The first legs were played on 1 and 2 December, and the second legs were played on 4 and 5 December 2021.

First leg

Second leg

Semi-finals
The first legs were played on 9 December, and the second legs were played on 12 December 2021.

First leg

Second leg

Final
The first leg was played on 15 December, and the second leg was played on 18 December 2021.

First leg

Second leg

Torneo Clausura
The Torneo Clausura began in January 2022.

Group 1

Standings

Positions by Round

Results

Group 2

Standings

Positions by Round

Results

Regular Season statistics

Top goalscorers
Players sorted first by goals scored, then by last name.

Source:Liga Premier FMF

Hat-tricks

(H) – Home ; (A) – Away

Attendance

Per team

Highest and lowest

Source: Liga Premier FMF

Liguilla
The four best teams of each group play two games against each other on a home-and-away basis. The higher seeded teams play on their home field during the second leg. The winner of each match up is determined by aggregate score. In the quarterfinals and semifinals, if the two teams are tied on aggregate the higher seeded team advances. In the final, if the two teams are tied after both legs, the match goes to extra time and, if necessary, a penalty shoot-out.

Quarter-finals
The first legs were played on 14, 15 and 16 April, and the second legs were played on 22 and 23 April 2022.

First leg

Second leg

Semi-finals
The first legs were played on 27 April, and the second legs were played on 30 April 2022.

First leg

Second leg

Final
The first leg was played on 5 May, and the second leg was played on 8 May 2022.

First leg

Second leg

Coefficient table 

Last updated: April 10, 2022 Source: Liga Premier FMFP = Position; G = Games played; Pts = Points; Pts/G = Ratio of points to games played; GD = Goal difference

Promotion Final
The Promotion Final is a series of matches played by the champions of the tournaments Apertura and Clausura, the game is played to determine the winning team of the promotion to Liga de Expansión MX, as long as the winning team meets the league requirements. 

The first leg were played on 12 May 2022, and the second leg were played on 15 May 2022.

First leg

Second leg

See also 
2021–22 Liga MX season
2021–22 Liga de Expansión MX season
2021–22 Serie B de México season
2021–22 Liga TDP season
2021–22 Copa Conecta

References

External links
 Official website of Liga Premier FMF

1